1130 Skuld, provisional designation , is a stony Florian asteroid from the inner regions of the asteroid belt, approximately 10 kilometers in diameter. It was named after Skuld from Norse mythology.

Discovery 

Skuld was discovered on 2 September 1929, by German astronomer Karl Reinmuth at Heidelberg Observatory in southwest Germany. The body was independently discovered by astronomers and fellow countrymen Arnold Schwassmann and Arno Wachmann at the Hamburger Bergedorf Observatory ten nights later.

Orbit and classification 

Skuld is a member of the Flora family, one of the largest groups of stony S-type asteroids in the main-belt. It orbits the Sun in the inner main-belt at a distance of 1.8–2.7 AU once every 3 years and 4 months (1,215 days). Its orbit has an eccentricity of 0.20 and an inclination of 2° with respect to the ecliptic.

Naming 

This minor planet was named after Skuld, one of the three Norns in Norse mythology. The asteroids 167 Urda and 621 Werdandi are named after the other two Norns. Naming citation was first mentioned in The Names of the Minor Planets by Paul Herget in 1955.

Physical characteristics

Rotation period 

In January 2004, the first rotational lightcurves of Skuld were obtained by Henk de Groot and by a group of Polish and French astronomers. Lightcurve analysis gave a rotation period of 4.73 and 4.8079 hours with a brightness variation of 0.46 and 0.40 magnitude, respectively.

In 2009 and 2011, astronomers Robert Buchheim and Larry Robinson obtained two well-defined lightcurves from photometric observations. They gave a refined period of 4.810 and 4.807 hours with an amplitude of 0.50 and 0.26 magnitude, respectively.

Diameter and albedo 

According to the surveys carried out by the Japanese Akari satellite and NASA's Wide-field Infrared Survey Explorer with its subsequent NEOWISE mission, Skuld measures between 9.63 and 11.009 kilometers in diameter and its surface has an albedo between 0.1995 and 0.302. The Collaborative Asteroid Lightcurve Link assumes an albedo of 0.24 – derived from 8 Flora, the largest member and namesake of this orbital family – and calculates a diameter of 9.99 kilometers with an absolute magnitude of 12.17.

Notes

References

External links 
 Lightcurve Database Query (LCDB), at www.minorplanet.info
 Dictionary of Minor Planet Names, Google books
 Asteroids and comets rotation curves, CdR – Geneva Observatory, Raoul Behrend
 Discovery Circumstances: Numbered Minor Planets (1)-(5000) – Minor Planet Center
 
 

001130
Discoveries by Karl Wilhelm Reinmuth
Named minor planets
001130
19290902